The fifth season of CSI: Crime Scene Investigation premiered on CBS on September 23, 2004, and ended May 19, 2005. The series stars William Petersen and Marg Helgenberger.

Plot
Greg begins his journey from a lab rat to a field mouse, as the Las Vegas Crime Lab faces a personnel overhaul ("Ch-Ch-Changes"), during the fifth season of CSI. The team's final days together are plagued with more investigations into the insane and the unusual, including the discovery of an "alien" corpse just outside the boundary of Area 51 ("Viva Las Vegas"), a body washed up in a thunderstorm ("Down the Drain"), the kidnapping of a thirteen-year-old girl ("Harvest"), a death at a fumigation ("Crows Feet"), a swingers party ("Swap Meet"), the return of the Blue Paint Killer ("What's Eating Gilbert Grissom?"), and a kidnapping at a hotel ("Formalities"). It's the appearance of new evidence that appears literally as Grissom is on the witness stand, however, that causes Ecklie to separate Grissom and Willows' team ("Mea Culpa"), with Catherine, Nick, and Warrick delving into cases such as brain death ("No Humans Involved"), a body in a car ("Who Shot Sherlock?"), a severed head containing a snake ("Snakes"), the death of a bear ("Unbearable"), and a murder involving sports betting ("Big Middle"). The risk of losing of one of their own, however, allows Ecklie and Grissom to set aside their differences, both personal and professional, and reunite the team once again ("Grave Danger").

Cast

Main cast

 William Petersen as Gil Grissom, a CSI Level 3 Supervisor
 Marg Helgenberger as Catherine Willows, a CSI Level 3 Supervisor
 Gary Dourdan as Warrick Brown, a CSI Level 3
 George Eads as Nick Stokes, a CSI Level 3
 Jorja Fox as Sara Sidle, a CSI Level 3
 Eric Szmanda as Greg Sanders, a CSI Level 1
 Robert David Hall as Al Robbins, the Chief Medical Examiner
 Paul Guilfoyle as Jim Brass, a Homicide Detective Captain

Recurring cast

 Archie Kao as Archie Johnson 
 David Berman as David Phillips 
 Wallace Langham as David Hodges 
 Aisha Tyler as Mia Dickerson 
 Louise Lombard as Sofia Curtis
 Marc Vann as Conrad Ecklie
 Jason Segel as Neil Jansen
 James Patrick Stuart as Adam Matthews

Episodes

References

External links
 DVD Release Dates at TVShowsOnDVD.com.

05
2004 American television seasons
2005 American television seasons